The 1988 Ole Miss Rebels football team represented the University of Mississippi as a member of the Southeastern Conference during the 1988 NCAA Division I-A football season. Led by sixth-year head coach  Billy Brewer, the Rebels compiled an overall record of 5–6 with a mark of 3–4 in conference play, tying for sixth place in the SEC.

Schedule

Roster

References

Ole Miss
Ole Miss Rebels football seasons
Ole Miss Rebels football